In mathematics, Legendre's formula gives an expression for the exponent of the largest power of a prime p that divides the factorial n!.  It is named after Adrien-Marie Legendre.  It is also sometimes known as de Polignac's formula, after  Alphonse de Polignac.

Statement 
For any prime number p and any positive integer n, let  be the exponent of the largest power of p that divides n (that is, the  p-adic valuation of n).  Then

where  is the floor function.  While the sum on the right side is an infinite sum, for any particular values of n and p it has only finitely many nonzero terms: for every i large enough that , one has . This reduces the infinite sum above to

where .

Example 
For n = 6, one has .  The exponents  and  can be computed by Legendre's formula as follows:

Proof 
Each multiple of  contributes an additional factor of p, each multiple of  contributes yet another factor of p, etc.

Alternate form 
One may also reformulate Legendre's formula in terms of the base-p expansion of n.  Let  denote the sum of the digits in the base-p expansion of n; then
	

	
For example, writing n = 6 in binary as 610 = 1102, we have that  and so 

Similarly, writing 6 in ternary as 610 = 203, we have that  and so

Proof 
Write  in base p.  Then , and therefore

Applications 
Legendre's formula can be used to prove Kummer's theorem.  As one special case, it can be used to prove that if n is a positive integer then 4 divides  if and only if n is not a power of 2.

It follows from Legendre's formula that the p-adic exponential function has radius of convergence .

References 

 
 , page 77
 Leonard Eugene Dickson, History of the Theory of Numbers, Volume 1, Carnegie Institution of Washington, 1919, page 263.

External links 

Factorial and binomial topics